Agustín de Spínola Basadone (Genoa, 1597 – Seville, 1649) was a Spanish cardinal and statesman in the service of Philip IV. He was the son of Ambrogio Spinola, one of the greatest military commanders of his time.

Career
Agustín pursued a career within the church. He was Protonotary apostolic until 1621, when he was made a Cardinal by Pope Paul V. He was Bishop of Tortosa in 1623, Archbishop of Granada in 1626 and Archbishop of Santiago de Compostela in 1630. He stayed in Rome between 1630 and 1635 and was the Camerlengo of the Sacred College of Cardinals in 1632 and 1633. In 1637 Spinola was called to the Spanish Court as a councillor. In 1643, he was captain-general of Galicia for 3 months. In 1645 he became Archbishop of Seville. He served until his death in 1649.

Cardinal Spinola did not participate in any of the Papal conclaves of his time (1621-1644).

References

1597 births
1649 deaths
16th-century Genoese people
17th-century Genoese people
17th-century Spanish cardinals
17th-century Roman Catholic archbishops in Spain
Roman Catholic archbishops of Seville
University of Salamanca alumni
Archbishops of Granada
Archbishops of Santiago de Compostela
Spinola family
Clergy from Genoa
Italian emigrants to Spain